Dihydrojasmone is an aroma compound with the chemical formula C11H18O. It has a fruity, jasmine odor with woody and herbal undertones. Perfumery uses include natural green, woody, lavender and bergamot. Dihydrojasmone is found in citrus and in bergamot orange oil. Dihydrojasmone belongs to the family of ketones.

References 

Enones
Cyclopentenes